A number of separate, but overlapping, investigations were conducted by the police into various aspects of the 2000 coup. These investigations include the organization and financing of the coup, and the identity of the perpetrators.

Bibliography
 Trnka, S. (2011). State of Suffering: Political Violence and Community Survival in Fiji. United States: Cornell University Press.,  
 Pretes, M. (2008). Coup: Reflections on the Political Crisis in Fiji. United States: ANU E Press.,  
Baba, T., Nabobo-Baba, U., Field, M. (2005). Speight of Violence: Inside Fiji's 2000 Coup. Australia: Pandanus Books.,  

2000 Fijian coup d'état